Paid in Error is a 1938 British comedy film directed by Maclean Rogers and featuring George Carney, Lillian Christine and Tom Helmore. The screenplay concerns a man who is mistakenly given a large sum of money at the bank.

Cast
 George Carney as Will Baker
 Lillian Christine as Joan Atherton
 Tom Helmore as Jimmy Randle
 Marjorie Taylor as Penny Victor
 Googie Withers as Jean Mason
 Molly Hamley-Clifford as Mrs. Jenkins
 Jonathan Field as Jonathan Green
 Aubrey Mallalieu as George

References

External links 
 
 Paid in Error at BFI

1938 comedy films
1938 films
British comedy films
British black-and-white films
Films directed by Maclean Rogers
1930s English-language films
1930s British films